Jack Fritz may refer to:

Jack Fritz (politician) (born 1950), Micronesian politician 
Jack Fritz (radio personality) (born 1994), radio personality at 94.1 WIP